Gebze is a district in Kocaeli Province, Turkey.  It is situated 65 km (30 mi) southeast of Istanbul, on the Gulf of Izmit, the eastern arm of the Sea of Marmara. Gebze is the largest district per population size in the province as of 2020-exceeding İzmit, the provincial capital. 
Gebze has experienced rapid growth in recent years, from 159,116 residents in 1990 to 392.945 in 2020.

Geography
The district of Gebze is located in the western portion of Kocaeli Province; with neighbors Körfez to the east; Pendik, Tuzla and Şile in Istanbul to the northwest,west and north respectively; Çayırova and Darıca to the southwest and Dilovası to the southeast.

Transport
The northern terminus of Osman Gazi Bridge falls within this area; the construction — having a total length of 4 kilometers (with a 1,688-meter main span) — bridges the Sea of Marmara from Kababurun to Dilburnu. The Gebze Metro began construction in 2018 for a 2023 opening. A Marmaray intercontinental commuter rail line connects Gebze to the European side of Istanbul.

Twin towns – sister cities

Gebze is twinned with:

 Garoowe, Somalia
 Kakanj, Bosnia and Herzegovina
 Karakol, Kyrgyzstan
 Kiseljak, Bosnia and Herzegovina
 Kythrea, Cyprus
 Oeiras, Portugal
 Pylaia, Greece
 Samuil, Bulgaria
 Studeničani, North Macedonia
 Tyulyachinsky District, Russia

Gallery

References

External links

Gebze Municipality 
Gebze Hotel Guide
Gebze Firma Rehberi
Large gallery with pictures of Çoban Mustafa Paşa mosque

 
Cities in Turkey
Populated places in Kocaeli Province
Districts of Kocaeli Province